William Simon or Bill Simon may refer to:

 William E. Simon (19272000), former United States Secretary of the Treasury
 William H. Simon, Columbia Law School professor
 William S. Simon (born 1960), president and CEO of Walmart U.S. (20102014)
 William Simon (sociologist) (19202000)
 Bill Simon (politician) (William Edward Simon, Jr., born 1951), American businessman and politician
 Bill Simon (musician) (William L. Simon, 19202000), American jazz musician
 Glyn Simon (William Glyn Hughes Simon, 19031972), Archbishop of Wales

See also